Barbatus is a word of Latin origin meaning "bearded". It can refer to:

People
Barbatus of Benevento (c. 610 – 682), bishop of Benevento from 663 to 682
John Varvatos, American contemporary high fashion menswear designer
Lucius Cornelius Scipio Barbatus (died c. 280 BC), one of the two elected Roman consuls in 298 BC
Marcus Horatius Barbatus, one of two consuls who were said to have replaced the decemvirs in 449 BC
Marcus Valerius Messalla Barbatus (11 BC - AD 20/21) was a consul of ancient Rome

Other
8978 Barbatus (3109 T-3), an outer main-belt asteroid discovered on October 16, 1977

See also
Barbat (disambiguation)

pl:Barbatus